The Jubilee Yacht Club is a private yacht club located in Beverly, Massachusetts, United States.

History 
Incorporated in 1896, Jubilee Yacht Club is a private membership based organization with over 400 active members. Jubilee has an active cruising fleet, a busy regatta schedule, an active social calendar, and frequent fishing tournaments. The club is also a strong supporter of junior sailing.

Fleets 
The club is home of One-Design Snipe fleet number 554, J/24 Fleet 28, and J/105 Fleet 2.

References

External links 
 Official website

1896 establishments in Massachusetts
Sailing in Massachusetts
Yacht clubs in the United States
Sports in Beverly, Massachusetts